The Mattachine Society, founded in 1950, was an early national gay rights organization in the United States, preceded by several covert and open organizations, such as Chicago's Society for Human Rights. Communist and labor activist Harry Hay formed the group with a collection of male friends in Los Angeles to protect and improve the rights of gay men. Branches formed in other cities, and by 1961 the Society had splintered into regional groups.

At the beginning of gay rights protest, news on Cuban prison work camps for homosexuals inspired Mattachine Society to organize protests at the United Nations and the White House in 1965.

Name 
The Mattachine Society was named by Harry Hay at the suggestion of James Gruber, inspired by a French medieval and renaissance masque group he had studied while preparing a course on the history of popular music for a workers' education project. In a 1976 interview with Jonathan Ned Katz, Hay was asked the origin of the name Mattachine. He mentioned the medieval-Renaissance French Sociétés Joyeuses:

This French group was named in turn after Mattaccino (or the Anglicized Mattachino), a character in Italian theater. Mattaccino was a kind of court jester, who would speak the truth to the king when nobody else would. The "mattachin" (from Arabic  , "mask-wearers") were originally Moorish (Hispano-Arab) sword-dancers who wore elaborate, colorful costumes and masks.

The Mattachine Society used so-called harlequin diamonds as their emblem. The design consisted of four diamonds arranged in a pattern to form a larger diamond.

Foundation 
Harry Hay conceived the idea of a gay activist group in 1948. After signing a petition for Progressive Party presidential candidate Henry A. Wallace, Hay spoke with other gay men at a party about forming a gay support organization for him called "Bachelors for Wallace". Encouraged by the response he received, Hay wrote the organizing principles that night, a document he referred to as "The Call". However, the men who had been interested at the party were less than enthusiastic the following morning. Over the next two years, Hay refined his idea, finally conceiving of an "international... fraternal order" to serve as "a service and welfare organization devoted to the protection and improvement of Society's Androgynous Minority". He planned to call this organization "Bachelors Anonymous" and envisioned it serving a similar function and purpose as Alcoholics Anonymous. Hay met Rudi Gernreich in July 1950. The two became partners, and Hay showed Gernreich The Call. Gernreich, declaring the document "the most dangerous thing [he had] ever read", became an enthusiastic financial supporter of the venture, although he did not lend his name to it (going instead by the initial "R"). Finally on November 11, 1950, Hay, along with Gernreich and friends Dale Jennings and partners Bob Hull and Chuck Rowland, held the first meeting of the Mattachine Society in Los Angeles, under the name Society of Fools. James Gruber and Konrad Stevens joined the Society in April 1951 and they are generally considered to be original members. Also that month the group changed its name to Mattachine Society, a name suggested by Gruber and chosen by Hay, after Medieval French secret societies of masked men who, through their anonymity, were empowered to criticize ruling monarchs with impunity.

As Hay became more involved in his Mattachine work, he correspondingly became more concerned that his orientation would negatively affect the Communist Party, which like most other organizations at the time was anti-homosexual and did not allow gay people to be members. Hay himself approached party leaders and recommended his own expulsion. The party decided to expel him as a "security risk", but declared him a "Lifelong Friend of the People" in recognition of his previous work for the party.

Mattachine was originally organized in similar structure to the Communist Party, with cells, oaths of secrecy and five different levels of membership, each of which required greater levels of involvement and commitment. As the organization grew, the levels were expected to subdivide into new cells, creating both the potential for horizontal and vertical growth. The founding members constituted the so-called "Fifth Order" and from the outset remained anonymous. The primary goals of the society were to

 "Unify homosexuals isolated from their own kind";
 "Educate homosexuals and heterosexuals toward an ethical homosexual culture paralleling the cultures of the Negro, Mexican and Jewish peoples";
 "Lead the more socially conscious homosexual to provide leadership to the whole mass of social variants"; and
 "Assist gays who are victimized daily as a result of oppression".

Mattachine's membership grew slowly at first but received a major boost in February 1952 when founder Jennings was arrested in a Los Angeles park and charged with lewd behavior. Often, men in Jennings' situation would simply plead guilty to the charge and hope to quietly rebuild their lives. Jennings and the rest of the Fifth Order saw the charges as a means to address the issue of police entrapment of homosexual men. The group began publicizing the case (under the name "Citizens Committee to Outlaw Entrapment") and the publicity it generated brought in financial support and volunteers. Jennings admitted during his trial to being a homosexual but insisted he was not guilty of the specific charge. The jury deadlocked and Mattachine declared victory.

Affiliations 
Most of the Mattachine founders were communists. As the Red Scare progressed, the association with communism concerned some members as well as supporters and Hay, a dedicated member of the CPUSA for 15 years, stepped down as the Society's leader. Others were similarly ousted, and the leadership structure became influenced less by communism, replaced by a moderate ideology similar to that espoused by the liberal reformist civil rights organizations that existed for African Americans. Although Hay claimed "never to have even heard" of the earlier gay liberation struggle in Germany—by the people around Adolf Brand, Magnus Hirschfeld and the Austrian-Hungarian Leontine Sagan—he is known to have talked about it with German émigrés in America, including the Austrian-born Rudi Gernreich.

The Mattachine Society existed as a single national organization headquartered first in Los Angeles and then, beginning around 1956, in San Francisco. Outside of Los Angeles and San Francisco, chapters were established in New York; Washington, D.C.; Chicago; and other locales. Due to internal disagreements, the national organization disbanded in 1961. The San Francisco national chapter retained the name "Mattachine Society", while the New York chapter became "Mattachine Society of New York, Inc" and was commonly known by its acronym MSNY. Other independent groups using the name Mattachine were formed in Washington, D.C. (Mattachine Society of Washington, 1961), in Chicago (Mattachine Midwest, 1965), and in Buffalo (Mattachine Society of the Niagara Frontier, 1970). In 1963 Congressman John Dowdy introduced a bill which resulted in congressional hearings to revoke the license for solicitation of funds of the Mattachine Society of Washington; the license was not revoked.

A largely amicable split within the national Society in 1952 resulted in a new organization called ONE, Inc. ONE admitted women and, together with Mattachine, provided help to the Daughters of Bilitis in the launching of that group's magazine, The Ladder, in 1956. The Daughters of Bilitis were an independent lesbian organization who occasionally worked with the predominantly male Mattachine Society.

The Janus Society grew out of lesbian and gay activists meeting regularly, beginning in 1961, in hopes of forming a Mattachine Society chapter. The group was not officially recognized as such a chapter, however, and so instead named itself the Janus Society of Delaware Valley. In 1964 they renamed themselves the Janus Society of America due to their increasing national visibility.

In January 1962 East Coast Homophile Organizations (ECHO) was established, with its formative membership including the Mattachine Society chapters in New York and Washington D.C., the Janus Society, and the Daughters of Bilitis chapter in New York. ECHO was meant to facilitate cooperation between homophile organizations and outside administrations. In 1964, ECHO received a $500 settlement from the Manger Hamilton hotel upon the hotel's last minute cancellation of ECHO's conference in their location. This out of court settlement was portrayed by the organization as an affirmation to the homophile community that they were not to mess with and that any matters that violated their rights would be handled in accordance with the law.

On the eve of January 1, 1965, several homophile organizations in San Francisco, California - including Mattachine, the Daughters of Bilitis, the Council on Religion and the Homosexual, and the Society for Individual Rights - held a fund-raising ball for their mutual benefit at California Hall on Polk Street. San Francisco police had agreed not to interfere; however, on the evening of the ball, the police surrounded the building and focused numerous Klieg lights on its entrance. As each of the 600 plus persons entering the ball approached the entrance, the police took their photographs.  Police vans were parked in plain view near the entrance to the ball. Evander Smith, a (gay) lawyer for the groups organizing the ball, and gay lawyer Herb Donaldson tried to stop the police from conducting the fourth "inspection" of the evening; both were arrested, along with two heterosexual lawyers - Elliott Leighton and Nancy May - who were supporting the rights of the participants to gather at the ball. But twenty-five of the most prominent lawyers in San Francisco joined the defense team for the four lawyers, and the judge directed the jury to find the four not-guilty before the defense had even had a chance to begin their argumentation when the case came to court. This event has been called "San Francisco's Stonewall" by some historians; the participation of such prominent litigators in the defense of Smith, Donaldson and the other two lawyers marked a turning point in gay rights on the West Coast of the United States.

Decline 
Following the Jennings trial, the group expanded rapidly, with founders estimating membership in California by May 1953 at over 2,000 with as many as 100 people joining a typical discussion group. Membership diversified, with more women and people from a broader political spectrum becoming involved. With that growth came concern about the radical left slant of the organization. In particular, Hal Call and others out of San Francisco along with Ken Burns from Los Angeles wanted Mattachine to amend its constitution to clarify its opposition to so-called "subversive elements" and to affirm that members were loyal to the United States and its laws (which declared homosexuality illegal). In an effort to preserve their vision of the organization, the Fifth Order members revealed their identities and resigned their leadership positions at Mattachine's May 1953 convention. With the founders gone, Call, Burns and other like-minded individuals stepped into the leadership void, and Mattachine officially adopted non-confrontation as an organizational policy. Some historians argue that these changes reduced the effectiveness of this newly organized Mattachine and led to a precipitous drop in membership and participation. Other historians contend that the Mattachine Society between 1953 and 1966 was enormously effective as it published a magazine, developed relationships with allies in the fight for homosexual equality, and influenced public opinion on the topic too.

During the 1960s, the various unaffiliated Mattachine Societies, especially the Mattachine Society in San Francisco and MSNY, were among the foremost gay rights groups in the United States, but beginning in the middle 1960s and, especially, following the Stonewall riots of 1969, they began increasingly to be seen as too traditional, and not willing enough to be confrontational. Like the divide that occurred within the Civil Rights Movement, the late 1960s and the 1970s brought a new generation of activists, many of whom felt that the gay rights movement needed to endorse a larger and more radical agenda to address other forms of oppression, the Vietnam War, and the sexual revolution. Several unaffiliated entities that went under the name Mattachine eventually lost support or fell prey to internal division.

In 1973 Hal Call opened the Cinemattachine, a venue showing both Mattachine newsreels and pornographic movies.  The Cinemattachine was an extension of the Mattachine Society's Sex Education Film Series and branded as being presented by both The Mattachine Society and The Seven Committee.  In 1976 a venue with the name Cinemattachine Los Angeles at the ONE opened. The same screenings as the San Francisco establishment were shown there. Mattachine co-founder Chuck Rowland indicated that he did not feel that Call associating this venue with The Mattachine Society was appropriate.

Legacy 

In the Quantum Leap comic book titled Up Against a Stonewall (1992), the Mattachine Society and the Daughters of Bilitis are mentioned as two groups campaigning for LGBT rights prior to the Stonewall riots.

The 1995 film Stonewall included members of the Mattachine Society of New York among its characters. Mattachine members are seen leafleting, attending meetings and participating in the Annual Reminder picket in Philadelphia. However, the film sets the Reminder earlier in the summer than it really was, predating the June 28 Stonewall riots.

In 2002 Mattachine Midwest was inducted into the Chicago Gay and Lesbian Hall of Fame.

In 2009 the Mattachine Society and its founders became the subjects of the play The Temperamentals by Jon Marans. After workshop performances in 2009, the play opened Off-Broadway at New World Stages in early 2010. The Temperamentals received a Drama Desk Award for Best Ensemble Cast. Michael Urie, who originated the role of Rudi Gernreich, received a Lucille Lortel Award for Outstanding Lead Actor.

A new Mattachine Society of Washington, D.C. was formed in 2011 and is dedicated to original archival research of LGBT political history.

The Playboy Club, a 2011 television series on NBC, includes a lesbian Playboy Bunny in a lavender marriage with a gay man. The two are members of the Chicago Mattachine chapter.

The Mattachine Steps, also known as the Cove Avenue stairway, is an outdoor staircase in Silver Lake, Los Angeles, dedicated to the Mattachine Society in 2012 in memory of its founder Harry Hay.

In 2015, a gay bar called Bar Mattachine opened in downtown Los Angeles. The podcast "Making Gay History" (season 1, episode 7) is about Mattachine co-founder Chuck Rowland, and another episode is about Mattachine co-founder Harry Hay (season 4, episode 3).

Julius’ bar in Manhattan has held a monthly party called "Mattachine" honoring the early gay rights pioneers.

See also 

 Dick Leitsch
 LGBT rights in the United States
 List of LGBT rights organizations
 Radical Faeries
 Timeline of LGBT history

References 
Notes

Citations

Bibliography

 
 
 
 
 
 
 Miller, Neil (1995). Out of the Past: Gay and Lesbian History from 1869 to the Present. New York: Vintage Books. . .

Further reading 
 Boyd, Nan Alamilla. Wide Open Town: A History of Queer San Francisco to 1965. University of California Press, 2003.
 Bullough, Vern L. Before Stonewall: Activists for Gay and Lesbian Rights in Historical Context. Harrington Park Press, 2002.
 Carter, David. Stonewall: The Riots That Sparked the Gay Revolution. St. Martin's Press, 2004.
 Dynes, Wayne R. (ed.). Encyclopedia of Homosexuality. New York and London: Garland Publishing, 1990.
 Johnson, David. The Lavender Scare: The Cold War Persecution of Gays and Lesbians in the Federal Government . University of Chicago Press, 2004.
 Mattachine Society Today, Mattachine Society, 1965.
 Poling, John D. Mattachine Midwest: The History of a Chicago Gay Rights Organization, 1965 to 1986 (thesis, M.S., Illinois State University, 2002).
 Sears, James T. Behind the Mask of the Mattachine. Harrington Park Press, 2006.
 White, C. Todd. Pre-Gay L.A. University of Illinois Press, 2009.

External links 
 Mattachine Society of Washington, D.C.
 Mattachine Society, Encyclopedia of Homosexuality
 Mattachine Society, Shreveport, Louisiana
 FBI file on the Mattachine Society
 Documents from the Mattachine Society's archives
 Mattachine-related correspondence of Franklin Kameny

 
1950 establishments in California
1950s in LGBT history
Communism in the United States
Defunct LGBT organizations in the United States
Gay history
History of LGBT civil rights in the United States
LGBT culture in Los Angeles
LGBT history in California
LGBT political advocacy groups in California
LGBT political advocacy groups in the United States
Organizations established in 1950
Secret societies in the United States